Physalaemus deimaticus is a species of frog in the family Leptodactylidae. It is endemic to Brazil and only known from its type locality in Jaboticatubas, Serra do Cipó, Minas Gerais. The specific name deimaticus is derived from Greek deimos fror "fear" and refers to the defensive display of this frog, probably aimed at scaring predators. Common names Jaboticatubas dwarf frog and frightening foam froglet have been coined for it.

Description
The type series consists of three specimens. The other female type is of similar size, whereas the male type measures  in snout–vent length. The overall appearance is robust. The snout is short. No tympanum is visible. The fingers and the toes are long and have neither webbing nor expanded tips. The dorsum has granulose skin and is light gray to light reddish brown in color. The interorbital stripe, middorsal stripe that splits in two posteriorly, and lateral bands are dark brown. The  glands are black with white margins.

Behavior
When threatened, this species performs a "deimatic" display in which it swells up its body, lowers its head, and raises its rump, such that the two large inguinal glands resembling eye spots are exposed. Similar display is known from Physalaemus nattereri.

Habitat and conservation
It probably breeds in water. It is not assumed to adapt well to anthropogenic disturbance, and could be threatened by fire, expanding human settlements, and disturbance resulting from tourism. It might occur with the Serra do Cipó National Park.

References

deimaticus
Endemic fauna of Brazil
Amphibians of Brazil
Amphibians described in 1988
Taxonomy articles created by Polbot